The Fredonia Gas Light Company, founded in 1858, was the first natural gas company in the United States. It was founded by a group of entrepreneurs after William Hart, considered the "father of natural gas" in the U.S., drilled in 1821 the first natural gas well in America along a creek in Fredonia, New York. The well was actually a big hole dug with shovels. The pipeline to transport the gas was made from hollowed out logs connected together with tar and rags.

References

Companies based in New York (state)
Natural gas companies of the United States